Dennis V. Kent is an American geologist and geophysicist who is a Board of Governors Professor Emeritus at Rutgers University and an adjunct Senior Research Scientist at Lamont–Doherty Earth Observatory of Columbia University. His research focuses on paleomagnetism, geomagnetism, rock magnetism, and their application to geologic problems, including geologic time scales, paleogeography, ancient climate, polar wander, and the long-term carbon cycle.

Education 
Kent graduated from Stuyvesant High School in Manhattan in 1964. He received a bachelor's degree in geology from the City College of New York, N.Y. in 1968 and a doctorate degree in marine geology and geophysics from Columbia University, N.Y in 1974, where he studied magnetism in deep-sea sediments.

Research and career 
Kent joined the Lamont–Doherty Earth Observatory as a research scientist in 1974 and the adjunct faculty in the Department of Earth and Environmental Sciences at Columbia University in 1981. He joined the faculty at Rutgers University in 1998. Kent and his co-authors developed chronostratigraphies based on  magnetic polarity time scale for the Triassic, Jurassic, Cretaceous, and Cenozoic. He has authored or co-authored more than 300 publications in the field of paleomagnetism, paleogeography, and paleoclimatology.

Awards and honors 

 2003 Arthur L. Day Medal, Geological Society of America
 2004 Member of the U.S. National Academy of Sciences
 2006 Petrus Peregrinus Medal, European Geosciences Union
 2009 William Gilbert Award, American Geophysical Union
 2012 Fellow of the American Academy of Arts and Sciences

Selected publications 

 Kent, D. V. (1982), Apparent correlation of palaeomagnetic intensity and climatic records in deep-sea sediments, Nature 299, 538–539, doi:10.1038/299538a0
 Cande, S. C., and Kent, D. V. (1992), A new geomagnetic polarity time scale for the Late Cretaceous and Cenozoic, J. Geophys. Res., 97( B10), 13917– 13951, doi:10.1029/92JB01202
 Berggren, W.A., Kent, D.V., Swisher, C.C. and Aubry, M.P. (1995), A revised Cenozoic geochronology and chronostratigraphy, SEPM Special Publication 54: 129–212.
 Kent, D.V. and Muttoni, G. (2008). Equatorial convergence of India and early Cenozoic climate trends. Proceedings of the National Academy of Sciences, 105: 16065–16070.
 Kent, D.V., Olsen, P.E. and Muttoni, G. (2017), Astrochronostratigraphic polarity time scale (APTS) for the Late Triassic and Early Jurassic from continental sediments and correlation with standard marine stages. Earth-Science Reviews, 166: 153–180.
 Kent, D.V., Olsen, P.E., Rasmussen, C., Lepre, C., Mundil, R., Irmis, R.B., Gehrels, G.E., Giesler, D., Geissman, J.W. and Parker, W.G. (2018), Empirical evidence for stability of the 405-kiloyear Jupiter-Venus eccentricity cycle over hundreds of millions of years. Proceedings of the National Academy of Sciences, 115(24): 6153–6158.
 Kent, D.V. and Muttoni, G. (2020), Pangea B and the Late Paleozoic Ice Age. Paleogeography, Paleoclimatology, Paleoecology, 553: 1-20.
 Kent, D.V. and Clemmensen, L.B. (2021), Northward dispersal of dinosaurs from Gondwana to Greenland at the mid-Norian (215–212 Ma, Late Triassic) dip in atmospheric pCO2. Proceedings of the National Academy of Sciences, 118(8): e2020778118.
 Channell, J.E.T., Muttoni, G. and Kent, D.V. (2022), Adria in Mediterranean paleogeography, the origin of the Ionian Sea, and Permo-Triassic configurations of Pangea. Earth-Science Reviews, 230: 104045.
 Kent, D.V. and Muttoni, G. (2022), Latitudinal land–sea distributions and global surface albedo since the Cretaceous. Palaeogeography, Palaeoclimatology, Palaeoecology, 585: 110718.

References 

Living people
American geologists
American geophysicists
Rutgers University faculty
Year of birth missing (living people)
Wikipedia Student Program